Yongpyeong-myeon is a myeon (township) in Pyeongchang county of Gangwon-do South Korea. The myeon is located in northern central part of the county. The total area of Yongpyeong-myeon is 135.43 square kilometers, and, as of 2008, the population was 3,129 people.

Places of interest 
 The ski resort of Yongpyong is not located on its territory, but in the township of Daegwallyeong-myeon.
 The Lee Seung-bok Memorial Center is located in Nodong-ri.

References 

Pyeongchang County
Towns and townships in Gangwon Province, South Korea